Kalahumoku I (Kalahuimoku I) was a chief of Hāna.

Kalahumoku was born either on Molokai or the Big Island to Kanipahu and Hualani, Hereditary High Chiefess of Molokai. Kalahumoku’s brother was Kanaloa, father of Kalapana of Hawaiʻi. 

David Malo wrote Kalapana was Kalahumoku's brother, but this was not true because Malo had ignored a generation. The two brothers had been brought up in retirement in the countryside of the Big Island, without the knowledge of Kamaiole, their father's usurper, because if Kamaiole had known them to be the sons of the chieftain, he would have put them to death.

Sometime after or before Kalapana came to the throne, Kalahumoku settled at Kauwiki on Maui and became a chieftain of Hāna. Kalahumoku married Laamea and begot a son, Iki-a-Laamea. Iki-a-Laamea married Kalamea and begot a son, Kamanawa-a-Kalamea. Kamanawa-a-Kalamea married Kaina (Kaiua) and begot Onakaina (Ua'kaiua). Onakaia married Kuamakani and had Kanahae-a-Kuamakani who married Kapiko and had Kuleana-a-Kapiko. Kuleana-a-Kapiko married Keniani-a-hoolei and had Akahiakuleana, mother of Umi-a-Liloa.

References

Abraham Fornander. An Account of the Polynesian Race: Its Origin and Migrations.
House of Pili
Royalty of Hawaii (island)
Royalty of Molokai